Berlinger may refer to:

 Berlinger & Co. AG, a company producing doping control systems in Ganterschwil, Switzerland
 Barney Berlinger (1908–2002), American decathlete
 Joe Berlinger (born 1961), American documentary film-maker
 Robert Berlinger (born 1958), American film and television director
 Warren Berlinger (1937–2020), American actor

See also
Berling (disambiguation)
Berlingeri, a surname
Berlingerode, in Thuringia, Germany
Berlinguer, a surname